Turkey straddles two peninsulas: Anatolia in Asia and Thrace in Europe. The surrounding seas are the Black Sea, Sea of Marmara, Aegean Sea and Mediterranean Sea. But the number of gulfs in the north (Black Sea) and the south (Mediterranean) is not high, because the mountain ranges lie more or less parallel to the coastline both in the north  and in the south . The majority of bays are on the west (Aegean and Marmara), where the mountain ranges are perpendicular to the coastline.

Major gulfs

See also 
Capes of Turkey
Peninsulas of Turkey
Geography of Turkey

References 

 
Lists of landforms of Turkey